The Rhine–Danube Corridor (previously known as Seine–Danube Corridor and Strassburg–Danube Corridor) is the ninth of the ten priority axes of the Trans-European Transport Network.

Description
The Strasbourg–Danube Corridor develops its network from the Seine to the Danube on the following three axes and through the following European cities (see route in cyano on the official TEN-T map published on the European Union website visible below in the note).

 Strasbourg – Stuttgart – München – Wels/Linz
 Strasbourg – Mannheim – Frankfurt – Würzburg – Nürnberg – Regensburg – Passau – Wels/Linz
 Wels/Linz – Wien – Budapest – Arad – Brașov – Bucharest – Constanța - Sulina

References

External links
 Trans-European Transport Network (TEN-T) at European Union official web site

Transport and the European Union
TEN-T Core Network Corridors